Oleria rubescens is a butterfly of the family Nymphalidae first described by Arthur Gardiner Butler and Herbert Druce in 1872. It is found in Mexico, south to Panama and Costa Rica.

The wingspan is 49–50 mm. Forewing length is 23–25 mm.

The larvae feed on Solanum siparunoides.

External links
Haber, William A. (17 November 2001). "Oleria rubescens (Butler & Druce)". Monteverde Natural History. Retrieved January 4, 2020.

Ithomiini
Butterflies described in 1872
Nymphalidae of South America
Butterflies of North America
Taxa named by Arthur Gardiner Butler
Taxa named by Herbert Druce